Donnell Lee Thomas (born December 21, 1968) is an American former basketball player. Standing at 196 cm, he played as small forward or power forward.

College career 
Thomas played college basketball for the Northern Illinois Huskies men's basketball team, where he was nicknamed "D-Train", for his rebounding ability. He led the team in scoring for three straight years and ended his NIU career as the team's second-highest scoring leader of all time. He was inducted in the NIU Huskies' Hall of Fame in 2003.

Professional career 
In 1992, Thomas played with the Nelson Giants of New Zealand's National Basketball League. He was named to the league's All-Star Five and was honoured as the Best Forward of the Commissioners Cup.

From 1995 to 1998, Thomas played for Donar in the Dutch Eredivisie. He was the league's Most Valuable Player in the 1997–98 season. Thomas was also named to the All-Eredivisie First Team three times (from 1996 to 1998). He also led the league in scoring in 1997 and 1998, becoming the second player in league history to do so, after Maurice Smith in 1991.

For the 1998–99 season, Thomas played in Israel for Maccabi Hadera. In the 1999–2000 season, he played for Den Helder. He averaged 22.7 points in 96 Eredivisie games played. He also played for Ural Great Perm in Russia that year, averaging 11.2 points in 19 games played.

For the 2000–01 season, Thomas played in Argentina for Ben Hur.

References 

1968 births
Living people
American expatriate basketball people in Argentina
American expatriate basketball people in Israel
American expatriate basketball people in New Zealand
American expatriate basketball people in Russia
American expatriate basketball people in the Netherlands
BV Den Helder players
Donar (basketball club) players
Forwards (basketball)
Nelson Giants players
Northern Illinois Huskies men's basketball players
PBC Ural Great players
People from Chicago